Nodeclipse is a set of third-party developer solutions for Eclipse for programming in JavaScript, CoffeeScript with focus on Node.js.

Nodeclipse also refers to the team that makes this software as free open-source on GitHub.

Nodeclipse Eclipse plug-in (Nodeclipse-1 on GitHub) is core that other solutions are based on. It is available via update site or Eclipse Marketplace. Other solutions are "Eclipse Node.js IDE" (Enide), set of plugins  and "Node Tool Suite" (NTS),  an integrated development environment (IDE).

History 
Nodeclipse was originally created by Chinese software developer LambGao 金氧. 
Project has contributors from 4 countries, while the original author has not participated for several months.
In April 2013 the Nodeclipse-1 plugin got 1072 installs through Marketplace clients alone.

In 2019 after 3rd disruption for need to pay to domain registrar, 
the main site (and Eclipse update site aka p2 repository) was moved to https://nodeclipse.github.io

Features 

Features set varies based on solution.

Below there are some basic features available:
 Code completion
 Debugger
 CoffeeScript support

Nodeclipse NTS & Enide Studio features
 Editor with code completion
 Debugger
 Generating Express project
 JSHint integration
 Passing arguments to Node application and Node.js
 Open Explorer or command line for current project'''
 Markdown editor

See also 

 Eclipse
 Comparison of JavaScript integrated development environments

References

External links
 

Eclipse software
Free computer libraries
Free integrated development environments